Aldona (baptized Ona or Anna; her pagan name, Aldona, is known only from the writings of Maciej Stryjkowski;  –  26 May 1339) was Queen consort of Poland (1333–1339), and a princess of the Grand Duchy of Lithuania. She was the daughter of Gediminas, Grand Duke of Lithuania.

Biography
Aldona married Casimir III of Poland, when he was 15 or 16 years old. The bride was probably of about the same age. The marriage took place on 30 April or 16 October 1325 and was a purely political maneuver to strengthen the first Polish–Lithuanian coalition against the Teutonic Knights. Casimir was seeking allies in the dispute over Pomerania with the Order. Gediminas had just undertaken an unsuccessful attempt to Christianize Lithuania. This coalition was a prelude to the Union of Krewo in 1385, and the Union of Lublin in 1569, which resulted in the creation of a new state, the Polish–Lithuanian Commonwealth. The details of the agreement are not known; however, it is known that Gediminas released all Polish captives, some 25,000 people, who returned to Poland. The importance of the marriage was attested by the fact that Władysław abandoned his earlier plans to marry his son to Jutta of Bohemia. The alliance was put into effect when joint Polish–Lithuanian forces organized an attack against the Margraviate of Brandenburg in 1326. However, the coalition was not strong and collapsed c. 1330. Yet, there is no evidence of fighting between Poland and Lithuania while Aldona was alive. Aldona died suddenly at the end of May 1339, and was buried in Kraków.

Aldona was remembered for her piety and devotion to music. She was accompanied by court musicians wherever she went. It was even suggested by Jan Długosz that the cymbals which were played in procession before her represented a pagan Lithuanian tradition. Her husband Casimir is known for his romantic affairs: after Aldona's death he married three more times.

Issue
Aldona had two daughters:
 Cunigunde of Poland (died in 1357); married on  1 January 1345 Louis VI the Roman, the son of Louis IV, Holy Roman Emperor.
 Elisabeth (1326–1361); married Bogislaus V, Duke of Pomerania. Elisabeth's daughter, Elizabeth of Pomerania, was the fourth wife of Charles IV, Holy Roman Emperor.

In popular culture

Film 
Queen Aldona Anna is one of the main characters in the first season of Polish historical TV drama series "Korona Królów" ("The Crown of the Kings"). She is played by Marta Bryła.

See also
 Family of Gediminas – family tree of Aldona
 Gediminids
 Aldona (fungus) (family Parmulariaceae), was named after her in 1900.

References

1309 births
1339 deaths
14th-century Polish nobility
Polish queens consort
Gediminids
Piast dynasty
14th-century Lithuanian people
14th-century Lithuanian women

14th-century Polish women
Year of birth uncertain
Lithuanian princesses
Casimir III the Great